The Grass Is Greener is an annual all ages music festival that is held in Cairns and The Gold Coast, Queensland (Previously in Mackay, Australia). 
Their first festival was held on Saturday April 23, 2016 in Cairns, Queensland.

Lineups year by year
As listed on the official website.

2016
April
 Allday (rapper) 
 Will Sparks
 Slumberjack
 Ivan Ooze
 Gill Bates 
 Tigerilla

October
 Hermitude
 LDRU
 Lookas (USA)
 Spit Syndicate
 Tired Lion
 Benson
 Feki
 Nora En Pure (ZA)
 Pon Cho
 Mallrat
 Getso
 Tenzin

2017
 Peking Duk
 Allday
 What So Not
 Ocean Alley
 British India
 Sachi (NZ)
 Willow Beats 
 Greta Stanley
 Enschway
 Ekali (CAN)
 J-el
 Faure
 Drewboy & The Sax Addicts
 Will Anderson

2018
 Carmouflage Rose
 Darude (FIN)
 Dear Seattle
 Ember
 Emme (CAN)
 Godlands
 Hayden James
 Herobust (USA)
 J-el
 k?d (USA)
 Kinder 
 Kota Banks
 Kwame
 Luca Brasi
 Made in Paris
 Manu Crooks
 Noah Devega
 Perto
 ShockOne
 Safia
 The Jungle Giants
 Xavier Mayne
 Tenzin

2019
 Tyga (USA)
 Amy Shark
 Hermitude
 Peking Duk DJ set (Gold Coast only)
 Golden Features
 The Veronicas
 Mallrat
 Crooked Colours
 Habstrakt (FRA)
 Holy Goof (UK)
 The Kite String Tangle
 The Aston Shuffle
 Kolombo (BEL)
 Graace
 Jordan Burns
 Choomba
 Sophiegrophie
 Taleena
 Reynier
 Jake Carmody
 SVLT (Gold Coast only) (USA)
 Lachy Faure (Cairns only)
 Hosted by Tenzin

2022
 Alok (BRA)
 Aluna (UK)
 Boo Seeka
 Brux
 Crush3D
 Jordan Burns
 Juno Mamba (Geelong only) Little Fritter
 Market Memories
 Mashd N Kutcher
 Maya Jane Coles (UK)
 Mikalah Watego
 Mood Swing & Chevy Bass
 Noy
 Onefour
 Piero Pirupa (ITA)
 Pnau
 Sidepiece (USA) (Gold Coast and Canberra only) Sticky Fingers
 TDJ (CAN)
 The Grogans (Geelong only) Ty Dolla $ign (USA)
 Vnssa (USA)
 Volaris (UK)
 Wafia (Cairns only)''
 Wongo
 YG (USA)
 Zero (UK)
 Zhu (USA) DJ Set

References

Concert tours
Rock festivals in Australia
Music festivals established in 2016
Electronic music festivals in Australia
2016 establishments in Australia